Anthela ocellata, the eyespot anthelid, is a moth of the family Anthelidae. The species was first described by Francis Walker in 1855. It is found in Australia, from Bundaberg to Hobart along the east coast.

The wingspan is about 60 mm.

The larvae feed on various grasses.

References

External links

Moths described in 1855
Anthelidae